Three Piece Reclining Figure: Draped 1975 is a bronze sculpture by Henry Moore, catalogued as LH 655. It is approximately 4.7m long. Seven casts and an artists proof were made. Three publicly exhibited casts are situated in the Sodra Kungsgatan in Gävle, Sweden, at the Massachusetts Institute of Technology in Boston, USA, and at the Henry Moore Foundation in Perry Green, Hertfordshire.

One of nine casts of Moore's Working Model for Three-Piece Reclining Figure: Draped 1975 (LH654) sold at auction at Sotheby's in New York in May 2015 for $2.89 million. One of the seven casts from the collection of Philip and Muriel Berman sold for $7.5 million in November 2004 at Sotheby's in New York City.

Columbus, Ohio
LH 655 cast 6 is installed outside the Columbus Museum of Art in Columbus, Ohio, United States. The abstract reclining figure measures  x  x .

See also

 List of sculptures by Henry Moore
 1975 in art
 List of public art in Columbus, Ohio

References

External links
 

1975 sculptures
Abstract sculptures in the United States
Bronze sculptures in Ohio
Bronze sculptures in Massachusetts
Bronze sculptures in Sweden
Columbus Museum of Art
Downtown Columbus, Ohio
Massachusetts Institute of Technology campus
Outdoor sculptures in Columbus, Ohio
Outdoor sculptures in Cambridge, Massachusetts
Outdoor sculptures in Sweden
Sculptures by Henry Moore